Kurugöl is a village in the Besni District, Adıyaman Province, Turkey. The village is populated by Kurds of the Hevêdan tribe and had a population of 656 in 2021.

The hamlet of Sumaklı Güzelevler is attached to the village.

References

Villages in Besni District

Kurdish settlements in Adıyaman Province